Quadrivio is a hamlet (frazione) of the comune of Campagna in the Province of Salerno, Campania, Italy. With a population of 5,352 it is the most populated settlement in its municipality.

History
The locality, originally named Starza, due to its position in the middle of a road junction (SS91 with SP31 and SP38) assumed the actual name meaning, in Italian, road junction. Built in the 1950s, it grew rapidly after 1980 Irpinia earthquake, becoming a single urban area with the union of the surrounding localities of Piantito, Vetrale, Fravitole, Visciglito and Starza proper.

Geography
The village is situated in the middle of its municipality and not too far from the town of Eboli.

Economy
Due to its geographical position and to its population, Quadrivio is the economic core of the municipality. It counts some factories, shops, banks, two pharmacies and one hotel.

See also
Campagna
Camaldoli
Puglietta
Romandola-Madonna del Ponte
Santa Maria La Nova
Serradarce

External links

Frazioni of the Province of Salerno
Localities of Cilento